Engine was an American progressive metal band. Engine's lead singer is Fates Warning's Ray Alder. In addition to Ray, the outfit also included the former Agent Steel guitarist Bernie Versailles, Armored Saint bassist Joey Vera plus Face to Face drummer Pete Parada. Their debut self-titled album was released in September 1999. Superholic was the follow-up, which was issued in May 2002.

Discography
Engine, Metal Blade (1999)
Superholic, Metal Blade (2002)

References

1999 establishments in Connecticut
2002 disestablishments in Connecticut
American progressive metal musical groups
Heavy metal musical groups from Connecticut
Musical groups established in 1999
Musical groups disestablished in 2002
Musical quartets
Metal Blade Records artists